Scott Cormode is an American theologian, currently the Director and Hugh De Pree Professor of Leadership Development at Fuller Theological Seminary.

References

Year of birth missing (living people)
Living people
Fuller Theological Seminary faculty
American theologians
Place of birth missing (living people)